Guillemette may refer to:

People 
 Alphonse-Edgar Guillemette (1877–1950), Canadian politician
 Éloi Guillemette (1911–1984), Canadian politician
 Hélène Guillemette, Canadian politician
 Joanne Guillemette, U.S. politician
 Nancy Guillemette, Canadian politician
 Guillemette Andreu (born 1948), French Egyptologist and archaeologist
 Guillemette du Luys (fl. 1479), French surgeon
 Guillemette Laurens (born 1957), French opera singer
 Guillemette of Neufchâtel (1260–1317), French noblewoman
 Guillemette de Sarrebruck (1490–1571), French court official

See also 
 Guillemet, a punctuation mark